Jens Larsen (born August 22, 1969 in Aalborg) is a Danish former professional volleyball and beach volleyball player, and now the coach of the German club Wuppertal.

He has played for VHG (Vester Hassing Gymnastikforening), SV Bayer Wuppertal and HIK (Aalborg). He has coached Marienlyst (Denmark) and SV Bayer Wuppertal 1 (Germany)

Playing partners
 Jesper Hansen
 Thomas Lyø
 Peter Lyø

References
 

1969 births
Living people
Danish beach volleyball players
Men's beach volleyball players
Danish men's volleyball players
Danish volleyball coaches
Sportspeople from Aalborg